Club de Fútbol Platges de Calvià B is a football team based in Montuïri, Balearic Islands. Founded in 1976, the team plays in Primera Regional de Mallorca, holding home games at the Poliesportiu Municipal de Magaluf.

Since 2016, the club is the reserve team of CF Platges de Calvià.

History
Founded in 1976 as CD Cade Paguera, the club changed to CF Platges de Calvià in 1990 after a fusion with CD Santa Ponsa and CD Maganova-Juve, and spent 23 seasons in Tercera División before absorbing CD Montuïri in June 2016. The first-team eventually took Montuïri's place in the fourth division, while the original CF Platges de Calvià, who had been relegated, became the club's reserve team.

Season to season
As CD Cade Paguera

As CF Platges de Calvià

As CF Platges de Calvià B

23 seasons in Tercera División

References

External links
 
Futbol Regional team profile 

Football clubs in the Balearic Islands
Spanish reserve football teams
Sport in Mallorca
Association football clubs established in 1976
1976 establishments in Spain